The Order of Great Victory of the Thunder Dragon (Dzongkha : Druk Wangyel / Druk Wangyal) is the Highest Civilian Decoration in Bhutan awarded in recognition for outstanding dedication, loyalty and commitment. Instituted by King Jigme Dorji Wangchuck on 9 February 1967 and reorganized by King Jigme Singye Wangchuck on 29 September 1985 as the country’s principal national honour, it was redesigned and instituted as the Second Highest Honor in the kingdom. The decoration consists of a Badge and a Star. Its postnominal letter is DWG.

Ranks 

It is composed of two classes  :
 First Class. 
 Second Class.

Insignia

General disposition 
The general disposition of the insignia depend on the recipient's dress:

In National dress: 
 First Class:  a badge worn from a large neck ribbon and a star with a ribbon on the left breast. 
 Second Class: a badge worn from a large neck ribbon.

In European dress or uniform:
 First Class:  The badge hanging from a sash and a breast star on the left breast. 
 Second Class: The badge hanging from a sash (no breast star).

Details 

The 60 mm badge consists of a gold-plated back plate consisting of crossed dorji (crossed thunderbolt) with lattice work, and an enamelled flag of Bhutan with beaded gold edge, with the dragon mounted in gold.

The 80 mm breast star consists of a large ornate gold-plated back plate with silver trumpets (dhung) individually pegged onto back star. The centre is an enamelled flag of Bhutan, with the dragon in gold, identical to the badge. 

The ribbon is dark orange.

Notable recipients 
 Jigme Yoser Thinley, Former Prime Minister of Bhutan (17 December 2008).
 Sonam Tobgye, Chief Justice of Bhutan (17 December 2008).
 Dorji Lopen Kinley, Senior Lopen (17 December 2019).

References

External links 

Orders,_decorations,_and_medals_of_Bhutan
Awards established in 1985
1985 establishments in Bhutan